In mathematics, Jensen's inequality, named after the Danish mathematician Johan Jensen, relates the value of a convex function of an integral to the integral of the convex function. It was proved by Jensen in 1906, building on an earlier proof of the same inequality for doubly-differentiable functions by Otto Hölder in 1889. Given its generality, the inequality appears in many forms depending on the context, some of which are presented below. In its simplest form the inequality states that the convex transformation of a mean is less than or equal to the mean applied after convex transformation; it is a simple corollary that the opposite is true of concave transformations.

Jensen's inequality generalizes the statement that the secant line of a convex function lies above the graph of the function, which is Jensen's inequality for two points: the secant line consists of weighted means of the convex function (for t ∈ [0,1]),

while the graph of the function is the convex function of the weighted means,

Thus, Jensen's inequality is

The difference between the two sides of the inequality, is called the Jensen gap.

Statements
The classical form of Jensen's inequality involves several numbers and weights. The inequality can be stated quite generally using either the language of measure theory or (equivalently) probability. In the probabilistic setting, the inequality can be further generalized to its full strength.

Finite form
For a real convex function , numbers  in its domain, and positive weights , Jensen's inequality can be stated as:

and the inequality is reversed if  is concave, which is

As a particular case, if the weights  are all equal, then and  become

For instance, the function  is concave, so substituting  in the previous formula establishes the (logarithm of the) familiar arithmetic-mean/geometric-mean inequality:

A common application has  as a function of another variable (or set of variables) , that is, . All of this carries directly over to the general continuous case: the weights  are replaced by a non-negative integrable function , such as a probability distribution, and the summations are replaced by integrals.

Measure-theoretic form
Let  be a probability space. Let  be a -measurable function and  be convex. Then:
 

In real analysis, we may require an estimate on

In this case, the Lebesgue measure of  need not be unity. However, by integration by substitution, the interval can be rescaled so that it has measure unity. Then Jensen's inequality can be applied to get

Probabilistic form
The same result can be equivalently stated in a probability theory setting, by a simple change of notation. Let  be a probability space, X an integrable real-valued random variable and  a convex function. Then:

Note that the equality holds if and only if  is a linear function on some convex set  such that  (which follows by inspecting the measure-theoretical proof below).

General inequality in a probabilistic setting
More generally, let T be a real topological vector space, and X a T-valued integrable random variable. Then, for any measurable convex function  and any sub-σ-algebra  of :

Here  stands for the expectation conditioned to the σ-algebra .

A sharpened and generalized form 
Let X be a one-dimensional random variable with mean  and variance .  Let  be a twice differentiable function, and define the function

Then

In particular, when  is convex, then , and the standard form of Jensen's inequality immediately follows for the case where  is additionally assumed to be twice differentiable.

Proofs

Jensen's inequality can be proved in several ways, and three different proofs corresponding to the different statements above will be offered. Before embarking on these mathematical derivations, however, it is worth analyzing an intuitive graphical argument based on the probabilistic case where  is a real number (see figure). A similar reasoning holds if the distribution of  covers a decreasing portion of the convex function, or both a decreasing and an increasing portion of it. This "proves" the inequality, i.e. 

with equality when  is not strictly convex, e.g. when it is a straight line, or when  follows a degenerate distribution (i.e. is a constant).

The proofs below formalize this intuitive notion.

Proof 1 (finite form)

This can be generalized: if  are nonnegative real numbers such that , then

for any . 

The finite form of the Jensen's inequality can be proved by induction: by convexity hypotheses, the statement is true for n = 2. Suppose the statement is true for some n, so

for any  such that .

Since ,

 ,

applying the inductive hypothesis gives

 

therefore 

 

In order to obtain the general inequality from this finite form, one needs to use a density argument. The finite form can be rewritten as:

where μn is a measure given by an arbitrary convex combination of Dirac deltas:

Since convex functions are continuous, and since convex combinations of Dirac deltas are weakly dense in the set of probability measures (as could be easily verified), the general statement is obtained simply by a limiting procedure.

Proof 2 (measure-theoretic form)
Let  be a real-valued -integrable function on a probability space , and let  be a convex function on the real numbers.

Now, if we define

because of the existence of subderivatives for convex functions, we may choose  and  such that

for all real  and

But then we have that

for almost all . Since we have a probability measure, the integral is monotone with  so that

as desired.

Proof 3 (general inequality in a probabilistic setting)
Let X be an integrable random variable that takes values in a real topological vector space T. Since  is convex, for any , the quantity

is decreasing as  approaches 0+.

In particular, for an arbitrary sub--algebra  we can evaluate the last inequality when  to obtain

by the linearity of the subdifferential in the y variable, and the following well-known property of the conditional expectation:

Applications and special cases

Form involving a probability density function
Suppose  is a measurable subset of the real line and f(x) is a non-negative function such that

In probabilistic language, f is a probability density function.

Then Jensen's inequality becomes the following statement about convex integrals:

If g(x) = x, then this form of the inequality reduces to a commonly used special case:

This is applied in Variational Bayesian methods.

Example: even moments of a random variable

If g(x) = x2n, and X is a random variable, then g is convex as

and so 

In particular, if some even moment 2n of X is finite, X has a finite mean. An extension of this argument shows X has finite moments of every order  dividing n.

Alternative finite form

provided that  and

There is also an infinite discrete form.

Statistical physics
Jensen's inequality is of particular importance in statistical physics when the convex function is an exponential, giving:

where the expected values are with respect to some probability distribution in the random variable .

Proof: Let  in

Information theory

Therefore:

a result called Gibbs' inequality.

It shows that the average message length is minimised when codes are assigned on the basis of the true probabilities p rather than any other distribution q. The quantity that is non-negative is called the Kullback–Leibler divergence of q from p.

Rao–Blackwell theorem

If L is a convex function and  a sub-sigma-algebra, then, from the conditional version of Jensen's inequality, we get

So if δ(X) is some estimator of an unobserved parameter θ given a vector of observables X; and if T(X) is a sufficient statistic for θ; then an improved estimator, in the sense of having a smaller expected loss L, can be obtained by calculating

the expected value of δ with respect to θ, taken over all possible vectors of observations X compatible with the same value of T(X) as that observed. Further, because T is a sufficient statistics,  does not depend on θ, hence, becomes a statistics.

This result is known as the Rao–Blackwell theorem.

Financial Performance Simulation 
A popular method of measuring the investment performance of an investment is the Internal Rate of Return (IRR) which is the rate by which a series of uncertain future cash flows are discounted using Present Value Theory to cause the sum of the future cash flows to equal the initial investment. While it is tempting to perform Monte Carlo simulation of the IRR, Jensen's Inequality introduces a bias due to fact that the IRR function is a curved function and the expectation operator is a linear function.

See also
 Karamata's inequality for a more general inequality
 Popoviciu's inequality
 Law of averages
 A proof without words of Jensen's inequality

Notes

References
 
 Tristan Needham (1993) "A Visual Explanation of Jensen's Inequality", American Mathematical Monthly 100(8):768–71.
 
 
 
Sam Savage (2012) The Flaw of Averages: Why We Underestimate Risk in the Face of Uncertainty (1st ed.) Wiley. ISBN  978-0471381976

External links
 Jensen's Operator Inequality of Hansen and Pedersen.
 
 
 

Convex analysis
Inequalities
Probabilistic inequalities
Statistical inequalities
Theorems in analysis
Theorems involving convexity
Articles containing proofs